Black Rudolf (Swedish: Svarte Rudolf) is a 1928 Swedish drama film directed by Gustaf Edgren and starring Fridolf Rhudin, Inga Tidblad and John Ekman. It was shot at the Råsunda Studios in Stockholm. The film's sets were designed by the art director Vilhelm Bryde.

The film was premiered on 22 October 1928 and was shot in the Filmstaden Råsunda with exteriors from Dalarö, Drottningholm Palace Park, Roslagsbanan, Munsö in Mälaren and the waters off the Huvudskär lighthouse in the Stockholm archipelago by Adrian Bjurman.

Cast
 Fridolf Rhudin as Rudolf Carlsson
 Inga Tidblad as 	Nancy von Rosen
 John Ekman as 	Baransky
 Weyler Hildebrand as 	Franz Schultze
 Carl-Gustaf Berg as Per-Olof Sjöberg
 Linnea Spångberg as 	Inga Österman
 Signhild Björkman as 	Waitress
 Tor Borong as Customs Officer
 Birgit Chenon as 	Actress
 Karen Christensen as 	Kissing Scene Actress
 Lola Grahl as 	Ritzo-Rita
 Nalle Haldén as 	Department Store Manager
 Karl Jonsson as 	Cinematographer
 Ludde Juberg as Actor
 Herman Lantz as 	Bootlegger
 Katie Rolfsen as 	Beda Johansson
 Gunnar Skoglund as 	Actor
 Wilhelm Tunelli as Johan Österman

References

Bibliography
 Gustafsson, Tommy. Masculinity in the Golden Age of Swedish Cinema: A Cultural Analysis of 1920s Films. McFarland, 2014.

External links

1928 films
1928 drama films
Swedish drama films
Swedish silent feature films
Swedish black-and-white films
Films directed by Gustaf Edgren
1920s Swedish-language films
Films about filmmaking
Silent drama films
1920s Swedish films